The 1980 NHRA Winternationals (commonly known as the Winternats) were a National Hot Rod Association (NHRA) drag racing event, held at  Auto Club Raceway  in Pomona, California, on February 3.

Top Fuel Dragster 
The field also included Rance McDaniel (with a 5.85 second/ pass), John Kimble, Frank Bradley, Chris "The Greek" Karamesines, and Gary Beck; Don Garlits' 6.05/ pass was not good enough to qualify. 

Kalitta defeated former world champions in all three early rounds:  Rob Bruins, who redlighted; Beck; and Richard Tharp.. Muldowney faced #14 qualifier Mark Oswald in round one, Dave Uyehara (qualified #10) in round two, and #4-qualifier Kimble in round three.

The event win went to Muldowney, who defeated Kalitta in the final, their fourth final round meeting in a row, and Muldowney's fourth win.

Muldowney also claimed Low E.T.(5.83) and Top Speed (tying McDaniel) of the meet for the class Low qualifying e.t. paid Kalitta  $1000 from 7-Up.

Top Fuel Funny Car 
Dale Pulde's War Eagle Dodge Challenger qualified #8, at 6.12/. In round one, he defeated the Pontiac Firebird of Jim Dunn (qualified #10) in round one, Hank Johnson in round two, and Kenny Bernstein, whose fueller got badly out of shape, in the semi-final. (qualified 

War Eagle suffered chassis cracking, which was repaired with the assistance of every other team in the class, just before the final round. 

In the final, Pulde faced off against Ron Colson, in Roland Leong's Hawaiian Dodge Omni, who qualified #11; Colson was disqualified after crossing the centerline. War Eagles chassis broke at the end of the winning pass.

Low E.T. in class went to Kosty Ivanof's Chevrolet Corvette, at 6.05. Low qualifying e.t. also paid Ivanof $1000 from 7-Up.

Pro Stock 
The event win went to Lee Shepherd, after Jim Meyer was eliminated in round one and gearbox trouble took out Bob Glidden in the second round and a broken chassis claimed Kevin Rotty in the semi-final. 

Low e.t. earned Rotty $500 from 7-Up.

Top Gas Eliminator 

Pro Comp 
Pro Comp Eliminator was won by Brian Raymer's gas dragster, with a 6.67/ pass, defeating an unexpected finalist, Fred Hagen, in the BB/FC Darkhorse.

Notes

Sources 
Wallace, Dave. "Shirley Wins the West!", in Hot Rod, April 1980, p.52-6.

1980 in sports in California
NHRA Winternationals
1980 in motorsport